This is a list of AM radio stations in the United States having call signs beginning with the letters KN to KS.

KN--

KO--

KP--

KQ--

KR--

KS--

See also
 North American call sign

AM radio stations in the United States by call sign (initial letters KN-KS)